Vladimír Pištělák (born 30 July 1940) is a Czech former basketball player and coach. He was voted to the Czechoslovakian 20th Century Team in 2001.

Playing career

Club career
Pištělák won five Czechoslovakian League championships (1962, 1963, 1964, 1967, and 1968), and he was named the Czechoslovakian Player of the Year, in 1969. He was named to the FIBA European Selection Team in 1965 and 1968. He won the Belgian Cup title in 1970.

National team career
With the senior Czechoslovakian national team, Pištělák competed in the men's tournament at the 1960 Summer Olympics. With Czechoslovakia, he also won the silver medal at the 1967 EuroBasket, and the bronze medal at the 1969 EuroBasket.

Coaching career
After his playing career, Pištělák worked as a basketball coach.

References

External links
 

1940 births
Living people
Basketball players at the 1960 Summer Olympics
Czech basketball coaches
Czechoslovak basketball coaches
Czech men's basketball players
Czechoslovak men's basketball players
Olympic basketball players of Czechoslovakia
Sportspeople from Brno